Sir Guy Carleton Elementary School (commonly referred to as Carleton) is an elementary school located at the southern periphery of the Renfrew-Collingwood neighbourhood of Vancouver, British Columbia, Canada. It is part of School District 39 Vancouver.

History 
The school is located next to the intersection of Kingsway and Joyce Street and the original schoolhouse was central to the Collingwood community since its completion in 1896. It is ranked an "A" category heritage building in Vancouver's Heritage Register. Originally named the Vancouver East School, its name was changed to Collingwood Heights in 1908, and then to its present name in 1911. The school is named after Guy Carleton, the lieutenant-governor of Quebec during the late 18th century.

2008 schoolhouse fire 
At around midnight on March 2, 2008, the original schoolhouse was set ablaze by arsonists. The kindergarten classes that were taught in the schoolhouse had to be temporarily relocated due to the fire. After the fire, the Vancouver School Board (VSB) considered demolishing the charred building; however, the idea was met with heavy protest, and the idea was later scrapped.

In 2012, Green Thumb Theatre entered into a lease agreement with the VSB, restoring the two outbuildings. Construction was completed in early 2013, and one of the buildings became the administrative office for Green Thumb Theatre, while the other houses a theatre.

2016 brick building fire 
On August 19, 2016, at around 7:15 PM, a fire began on the third floor of the main brick building, which quickly spread and was subsequently upgraded to a four-alarm blaze. The flames reach the building's attic, where the fire was contained. The source of the fire remains unclear.  As of the 2016 fire, Carleton has remained vacant, although it is still under consideration by the VSB for future seismic upgrades.

Proposed closure 
In June 2016, the VSB announced their intention to close down Carleton, along with Graham D. Bruce Elementary School and Gladstone Secondary School, due to the VSB's failure to cut operating costs. In October 2016, the VSB announced that they would suspend their plans for school closures "indefinitely".

In February 2019, the VSB released a draft of their long-term facilities plan, which named twenty-eight schools, including Carleton, that the school board considered as possible future closures, due to low-enrollment numbers and/or a need for seismic upgrades.

Notable alumni 
 Michael Baldisimo, midfielder for Whitecaps FC

References

External links 
 Carleton School Profile
 Carleton website

School Reports - Ministry of Education
 Class Size
 Satisfaction Survey
 School Performance
 Skills Assessment

Elementary schools in Vancouver
Educational institutions established in 1896
1896 establishments in British Columbia